The Taiwanese Resistance to the Japanese Invasion of 1895 was a conflict between the short-lived Republic of Formosa (Taiwan) and the Empire of Japan. The invasion came shortly after the Qing dynasty's cession of Taiwan to Japan in April 1895 at the end of the First Sino-Japanese War.

The Japanese landed on the northern coast of Taiwan near Keelung on May 29, 1895, and swept southwards to Tainan. Although their advance was slowed by guerrilla activity, the Japanese defeated the Taiwanese forces (a mixture of regular Chinese units and local Hakka militias) in a campaign that lasted only five months. The Japanese victory at Baguashan on August 27 was the largest battle ever fought on Taiwanese soil and doomed the Formosan resistance to an early defeat. The fall of Tainan on the 21 of October ended organized resistance to Japanese occupation, and inaugurated five decades of Japanese rule in Taiwan.

Background and Causes

Mudan incident of 1871 

On November 6, 66 Ryūkyūan sailors wandered into the heart of Taiwan after their ship was destroyed in a typhoon, leaving them shipwrecked on the southeastern tip of Taiwan. On November 8 the 66 sailors arrived at the Mudan community and were ordered to stay there by the local Paiwan people. One day later, after expressing doubts, the 66 sailors attempted to escape. While 12 were taken into protective custody by Han Chinese officials, the remaining 54 were killed.

The survivors were lodged in the house of Yang Youwang, who allowed them to stay for 40 days. By giving clothing and food to the Paiwan people, he was able to placate them. Afterward, the Japanese sailors stayed at the Ryukyuan embassy in Fuzhou, Fujian for half a year, and subsequently returned home to Miyako.

In retaliation for Qing China's refusal to pay compensation on the grounds that the Taiwanese aboriginals were out of their jurisdiction, Japan sent a military force to Taiwan, the Taiwan Expedition of 1874. The first overseas deployment of the Imperial Japanese Army and Imperial Japanese Navy saw 3,600 soldiers win at the Battle of Stone Gate on May 22. Thirty Taiwan tribesmen were either killed or mortally wounded in the battle. Japanese casualties counted 6 killed and 30 wounded.

In November 1874 the Japanese forces withdrew from Taiwan after the Qing government agreed to an indemnity of 500,000 Kuping taels.

Japanese Occupation of the Pescadores 

The Pescadores Campaign took place from March 23–26, 1895, and marked the last military operation of the First Sino-Japanese War. As the 1895 Treaty of Shimonoseki between Qing China and Japan originally left Taiwan and the Pescadores out, Japan was able to mount a military operation against them without the fear of damaging relations with China. By occupying the Pescadores, Japan aimed to prevent Chinese reinforcements from reaching Taiwan. On March 15, 1895, a Japanese force of 5,500 men set sail for the Pescadores Islands and landed on Pa-chau Island the following March 23.

Due in part to the demoralized defenses of the Chinese, which boasted roughly 5,000 men, Japanese forces managed to take the Pescadores in just three days. While Japanese casualties were minimal, an outbreak of cholera killed 1,500 within days.

Treaty of Shimonoseki 

The final version of the Treaty of Shimonoseki was signed at the Shunpanro hotel in Shimonoseki, Japan on April 17, 1895. The treaty ended the First Sino-Japanese War between Japan and the Qing Empire.

While Japan had taken steps to ensure that Taiwan would be ceded to them as it would provide an excellent land for military expansion into South China and Southeast Asia, China recognized Taiwan's importance as a trading point to the West, and thus refused to include it in the treaty.

While Japan cited the cession of Taiwan to them as a necessity, China argued that it had been a province of China since 1885. Furthermore, as Taiwan had never been a battleground during the First Sino-Japanese War, Chinese officials refused to cede it, instead transferring sovereignty of the Penghu islands and the eastern portion of the bay of the Liaodong peninsula.

Eventually, China was unable to keep Taiwan and it was included in the treaty, thereby leading to Japan's invasion and ending 200 years of Qing dynasty rule.

The conditions Japan placed on China led to the Triple Intervention of France, Germany, and Russia just six days after the signing. Having established ports and enclaves in China, the three countries demanded that Japan withdraw its claim on the Liaodong peninsula.

The inclusion of Taiwan in the final treaty led pro-Qing officials to declare the Republic of Formosa in 1895. It would never gain international recognition.

Republic of Formosa 

After hearing of the cession of Taiwan to Japan, pro-Qing officials led by Qiu Fengjia declared the Republic of Formosa. Tang Jingsong, the Qing governor-general of Taiwan, became the republic's first President. Liu Yongfu, the retired Black Flag Army commander and national hero, began to serve as Grand General of the Army.

While the Republic of Formosa issued a declaration of independence, Western powers were unable to recognize it due to its legal cession to Japan in the treaty of Shimonoseki. Because Formosa intended to rely upon China for troops and defenses, it had to recognize China as sovereign, which alienated powers in Europe. Meanwhile, China refused to acknowledge the republic on the basis of not offending Japan, which also served to prevent the support of Chinese troops to Formosa. Tang Jingsong was even ordered to return to Peking.

Formosa had one week of uninterrupted existence until Japan landed on its shores on May 29, thus beginning the invasion.

Resistance

Tang Jingsong 

Tang Jingsong (traditional Chinese: 唐景崧; simplified Chinese: 唐景嵩; pinyin: Táng Jǐngsōng) (1841–1903) was a Chinese statesman and general. Military contributions include the convincing of the Black Flag leader, Liu Yongfu to serve China in Tonkin (North Vietnam), and although it ultimately failed he was also widely praised for his intellect during the Siege of Tuyên Quang (November 1884–March 1885).

Tang Jingsong was the governor of Taiwan when it was ceded to Japan in 1895 with the Treaty of Shimonoseki. He became president of the Republic of Formosa on May 25, 1895, and along with other Chinese officials, stayed to resist the Japanese. On June 3, 1895, the Formosan forces were defeated at Keelung, however news of the defeat wouldn't reach Taipei until June 4. Tang Jingsong fled Taiwan on June 6, just 3 days after the defeat at Keelung.

Liu Yongfu 

Liu Yongfu (1837–1917) was a soldier of fortune, as well as the commander of the Black Flag army. After being convinced to join the fight by Tang Jingsong, he achieved fame as a Chinese patriot during the fight against the French Empire in Tonkin (Northern Vietnam).

He had a strong relationship with Tang Jingsong, staying to fight the Japanese in Taiwan following the Treaty of Shimonoseki. Liu Yongfu was given the title of command of the resistance forces in the south of Taiwan, and made a general. When Tang Jingsong fled Taiwan, Liu Yongfu became the 2nd and final leader of the Republic of Formosa. When it became apparent that Taiwan was lost, on 20 October 1895 Liu fled Taiwan aboard a British merchant ship called the SS Thales. The Yaeyama caught up to the Thales in international waters near Amoy, but were unable to identify and take a disguised Liu Yongfu into custody. The actions of the Japanese government spurred a diplomatic protests from Britain, and the Japanese government issued an official apology for following and stopping the British ship. On October 21, Tainan was surrendered to the Japanese, signalling the end of any major resistance to the Japanese occupation.

The Capitulation of Tainan 

News that Liu Yongfu was fleeing Taiwan reached a shocked Tainan on the morning of October 20. With both Tang Jingsong, and Liu Yongfu gone, Formosa was left with no real leadership and the people did not know what to do. Many fled to the Port town of Anping, which was further from the front lines. The Chinese merchants in the area, as well as the European community were particularly concerned about this turn of events, fearing that the soldiers could grow violent and plunder or ransack the city. Three European workers from Maritime Customs at Anping, Alliston, Burton, and McCallum, were able to convince nearly 10,000 soldiers that had flocked to Anping to give up their weapons and surrender peacefully to the Japanese. Using one of the go-downs of Maritime Customs to house the surrendered weaponry, between 7,000 and 8,000 Chinese rifles had been secured by nightfall.

From there all that was left was to invite the Japanese to Tainan, a perilous task which no one volunteered. Eventually, two English Missionaries, James Fergusson and Thomas Barclay agreed to the dangerous task of going from Tainan to Lieutenant-General Nogi's headquarters at Ji-chang-hang. They carried with them a letter written by Chinese merchants explaining that the Chinese soldiers had laid down their weapons and would not fight back, and encouraging the Japanese forces to come in and maintain order quickly before things could fall into disarray. After walking only a couple of hours they were halted by the rifle shot of a Japanese sentry, but were eventually successful in delivering the message to Lieutenant-General Nogi. Nogi was understandably wary of the idea that this could be a set up, or ambush, however he decided to advance on Tainan that night, entering the city the next morning.

Lieutenant-General Nogi's forces entered Tainan at 7 a.m. on 21 October, and by 9 a.m. the Japanese flag was flying over Tainan. When Tainan was surrendered to the Japanese, it signaled the end of any major resistance to, and beginning of five decades of Japanese Occupation.

Formosan Forces 
While Taiwan had no shortage of soldiers in May 1895, Tang Jingsong exaggerated these numbers considerably in order to boost the moral of his own soldiers. He sometimes claimed to have as many as 150,000 soldiers including volunteers, however this number has been heavily scrutinized, and it has been discovered that 75,000 is much more accurate for the number of soldiers stationed on the island. The Formosan forces included Chinese soldiers from the Qing Garrison, Hakka militia units, and local volunteers. Members of the Qing garrison made up the largest percentage of their forces at about 50,000 soldiers, with the Hakka militia, and volunteer units making up the other 25,000. The forces were under the command of three different people varying by location. Liu Yongfu commanded approximately 20,000 men in the south, Qiu Fengjia, commanded about 10,000 men, and a Chinese admiral named Yang commanded 30,000 men in the north.

Casualties and Losses

Taiwan (Republic of Formosa) 
Formosan and Chinese casualties were high but are difficult to estimate. Around 7,000 enemy soldiers were collected by the Japanese from various battlefields though the total number of Formosan and Chinese dead has been estimated to be around 14,000.

Japan 
Japanese combat casualties in the invasion were less than that of the defending Formosan and Chinese troops. 515 troops were wounded, and 164 troops were killed. Death from diseases such as cholera and malaria were much higher. There was a cholera outbreak in the Pescadores Islands at the end of March 1895 that killed more than 1,500 Japanese soldiers, and an even higher number died of malaria in September 1895 in Changhua not long after it was taken by the Japanese. According to Japanese numbers, 4,642 soldiers died in Taiwan and the Pescadores Islands of disease. By the end of the campaign, 21,748 Japanese soldiers had been evacuated back to Japan while 5,246 soldiers had been hospitalized in Taiwan.

Among the casualties of disease was Prince Kitashirakawa Yoshihisa who had fallen ill from malaria on October 18 and died in Tainan on October 28, only seven days after the city's capitulation to the Japanese. The prince's body was escorted back to Japan by the cruiser . During this time, a rumor was widely circulated in Taiwan that the prince's death was due to a wound that he had received during the Battle of Baguashan.

Japanese Occupation

Economic Change 
After Japan occupied Taiwan, the Japanese government sought to improve agriculture in Taiwan. In the 1920s, the agricultural innovations helped to bring forth exceptional crops such as sugar and rice. The two crops became the biggest exports in the country from around 1900 to 1930. During this time, Taiwan experienced both a population and economic boom. However, unrest throughout the growing population seemed to incline that the benefits of the economic growth were not divided equally. The Japanese government also did a survey to recount and re-distribute land in the 1900s. The results concluded that over a two-thirds of owned land had been unaccounted for. This resulted in the tripling of taxes in Taiwan among land owners.

Cultural Influence 
After the occupation, in order to compete on the same level as the rising power of Western countries, Japan decided to utilize Taiwan as an economic resource. For this, several points of focus were introduced; these points included agriculture, an improved health system, public education, and more.

Even though the nationalists in Taiwan criticize the influence that Japan had on Taiwan, many agree that the health system was overall beneficial to the country. Following the occupation many health stations were established all over the country. Research centers were developed to research and contain infectious diseases. The police force established by the Japanese in Taiwan was also given the task of maintaining public health. Since this required extra supervision, the Baojia system was adopted and improved upon.

"Three Vices" 
Part of Japan's social policy involved the "Three Vices", which was considered by the Office of the Governor-General to be archaic and unhealthy. These were opium use, the practice of footbinding, and the wearing of queues.

Although Prime Minister Itō Hirobumi ordered that opium should be banned in Taiwan as soon as possible, the government remained involved in the narcotics trade until Japan's surrender in 1945.

The Colonial Government launched an anti-footbinding campaign in 1901, culminating in its eventual illegality in 1915. Footbinding in Taiwan died out shortly after, as violators were subject to heavy punishment.

In comparison, the Colonial Government did relatively little to limit the wearing of queues besides exert social pressure, never even issuing formal edicts or laws on the matter. After the fall of the Qing dynasty in 1911, the popularity of queues decreased further.

Religion 
Japan's religious influence on Taiwan existed in three phases.

Between 1895 and 1915 the Colonial Government chose to promote the existing Buddhist religion over Shintoism in Taiwan, under the belief that it could accelerate the assimilation of the Taiwanese into Japanese society. Under these circumstances, existing Buddhist temples in Taiwan were expanded and modified to accommodate Japanese elements of the religion, such as worship of Ksitigarbha (popular in Japan but not Taiwan at the time). The Japanese also constructed several new Buddhist temples throughout Taiwan, many of which also ended up combining aspects of Daoism and Confucianism, a mix which still persists in Taiwan today.

In 1915, Japanese religious policies in Taiwan changed after the "Xilai Hermitage incident". The hermitage was a zhaijiao Buddhist hall where the follower Yu Qingfang (余清芳) started an anti-Japanese uprising, in which many other folk religious and Taoist sects took part. The Japanese government discovered the plot and Yu Qingfang was executed in a speedy trial together with ninety-four other followers.

In 1937, after the Marco Polo Bridge Incident and the start of the Second Sino-Japanese War, Tokyo ordered the rapid acculturation of the peoples of Japan's colonies. This included an effort to disaccustom people from Chinese traditional religions and convert them into the nexus of State Shinto. Many Shinto shrines were established in Taiwan. Chinese family altars were replaced with kamidana and butsudan, and a Japanese calendar of religious festivals was introduced.

Non-Violent Protests 
The beginning of Japanese rule saw barely any resistance from the Taiwanese community. At the time, the people felt that Japanese rule could serve better than the governments previously established by the warlords. However, several decades after the establishment of Japanese government in Taiwan, in 1915, several political groups emerged. Among these were the Popular Party, New People's Society, and Taiwan Cultural Association. The biggest concerns of these societies were the recognition of Taiwanese culture, free speech, and an establishment of Parliament. However, since these petitions did not see widespread support, no real progress was made at the time. After the withdrawal of Japan, these movements helped set the political standard and general political opinions of current Taiwan.

From October 16 to 22, 1923, Hsieh Wen-ta (謝文達) flew over Tokyo and dispensed thousands of fliers against Japanese rule in Taiwan. Among the messages were "Taiwanese have long been suffering under tyrannical rule" and "The totalitarianism of the colonial government is a disgrace to the constitutional country of Japan!" Hsieh was the first Taiwanese aviator, flying in 1921.

Domestic Reaction 
The occupation was met with mixed feelings. During the 50 year occupation there were instances of rebellions and guerrilla warfare from the Taiwanese against the Japanese. Resolutions often led to battles and numerous deaths. From 1895 until 1902, fighting continued until the Japanese eventually gained control over most of the territory. This seven-year period of resistance ended when the Yunlin-based Tieguoshan force surrendered in May 1902. Over the following years, only several rebellions occurred. However, in October 1930 fighting between a Taiwanese tribe and the Japanese ensured. Through the conflict, over 130 Japanese died. The fighting concluded with the Japanese crushing the rebellion, in which over 600 Taiwanese died. This became known as the Musha Incident.

International Reaction 
Following the boom of agriculture in Taiwan, the export of sugar and rice increased. However, since Japan held the monopoly on this, Taiwan had little to offer on the international scene, and consequently had little to do with foreign countries.

References 

Battles involving Japan
Battles involving Taiwan
Japanese invasion of Taiwan (1895)